Marcos Remeseiro Conde (born 21 July 1992) is a Spanish footballer who plays for Bergantiños FC as an attacking midfielder.

Club career
Born in A Coruña, Galicia, Remeseiro joined Racing de Ferrol's youth setup in January 2009, after starting it out at local Ural CF. He made his debuts as a senior in the 2009–10 campaign in Segunda División B, appearing in three matches as a substitute.

On 19 April 2011 Remeseiro was loaned to SDC Galicia Mugardos, until June. Shortly after his return he rescinded his link, and joined Tercera División's CCD Cerceda.

On 19 July 2013 Remeseiro moved to Deportivo de La Coruña, also in the fourth level. He made his first team debut on 3 December of the following year, replacing Juan Carlos in the 67th minute of a 1–1 home draw against Málaga CF, for the season's Copa del Rey.

References

External links

1992 births
Living people
Footballers from A Coruña
Spanish footballers
Association football wingers
Segunda División B players
Segunda Federación players
Tercera División players
Tercera Federación players
Racing de Ferrol footballers
Deportivo Fabril players
Deportivo de La Coruña players
Real Oviedo Vetusta players
CD Boiro footballers
SD Compostela footballers
Bergantiños FC players